Mili Smith  (born 1 March 1998) is a retired Scottish curler from Perth. She was the alternate on the British team that won the gold medal at the 2022 Winter Olympics in Beijing.

Career

Juniors
Smith was a member of Team GB at the 2016 Winter Youth Olympics, playing lead on a team skipped by Ross Whyte. The team finished 5th overall. In the mixed doubles event, Smith was paired with South Korea's Hong Yun-jeong. They lost their lone match and were eliminated.

Smith joined the Sophie Jackson junior rink in 2016. In 2017, the Jackson team won the World Junior B championships, earning the right to represent Scotland at the 2017 World Junior Curling Championships. At the World Juniors, the team won the silver medal.

Women's
The Jackson junior team continued to play together following their junior career. In 2019, the team was invited to play in the third leg of the 2018–19 Curling World Cup, where they finished with a 2–4 record. Two weeks later, the team won the 2019 Scottish championship, defeating perennial winners Eve Muirhead in the final. Team Jackson had committed to play in the 2019 Winter Universiade (which ended just before the World Championships), so Scottish Curling initially wanted to send Muirhead to the 2019 World Women's Curling Championship as Scotland's representative. However, Team Jackson asked for a review of the rules, which stated the winner of the Scottish championship gets to represent the country at the World Championships. The review was successful, and Team Jackson went on to represent Scotland at the 2019 Worlds. They also played in the Universiade, where they finished fourth.

At the 2019 World Women's Curling Championship, Team Jackson finished in 10th place with a 4–8 record.

She won a gold medal at the 2022 Winter Olympics in Beijing as part of Team GB.

On 21 June 2022, Smith announced that she would be stepping away from elite level curling.

Smith was appointed Member of the Order of the British Empire (MBE) in the 2022 Birthday Honours for services to curling.

Personal life
Smith's brother is Kyle Smith who was the skip of the British team at the 2018 Winter Olympics. She attended the University of Stirling and Perth Academy with whom she won the Scottish Schools' Curling Championship in 2016. In 2021, she graduated from the University of Stirling with a bachelor's degree in psychology. She lives in Stirling.

References

External links

Living people
1998 births
Scottish female curlers
Sportspeople from Perth, Scotland
People educated at Perth Academy
Alumni of the University of Stirling
Curlers at the 2016 Winter Youth Olympics
Competitors at the 2019 Winter Universiade
Curlers at the 2022 Winter Olympics
Olympic curlers of Great Britain
Curlers from Stirling
Olympic gold medallists for Great Britain
Medalists at the 2022 Winter Olympics
Olympic medalists in curling
Scottish Olympic medallists
Members of the Order of the British Empire